Barbara Howard may refer to:
 Barbara Howard, Countess of Suffolk (1622–1681), English courtier
 Barbara Howard (athlete) (1920–2017), Canadian sprinter
 Barbara Howard (artist) (1926–2002), Canadian painter, wood engraver, draughtsperson, bookbinder and designer
 Barbara Howard (actress) (b. 1956), American actress
 John R. Coryell or Barbara Howard, American dime novelist
 Barbara Howard (Abbott Elementary), a fictional character on ABC's Abbott Elementary portrayed by Sheryl Lee Ralph